The Roman Catholic Diocese of Propriá is a Latin Rite suffragan diocese in the Ecclesiastical province of the Metropolitan Archbishopric of Aracaju in Sergipe state, northeastern Brazil.

Its cathedral episcopal see is Catedral Santo Antônio, dedicated to Saint Anthony of Padua, in the city of Propriá, also in Sergipe.

History 
 Established on April 30, 1960 as Diocese of Propriá, on territory split off from its simultaneously promoted mother see, the (newly Arch)Diocese of Aracaju.

Statistics 
As per 2014, it pastorally served 334,500 Catholics (97.4% of 343,600 total)  on 8,181 km² in 25 parishes with 30 priests (29 diocesan, 1 religious), 40 lay religious (1 brother, 39 sisters) and 9 seminarians.

Bishops
(all Roman rite)

Episcopal ordinaries
Suffragan Bishops of Propriá 
 José Brandão de Castro, Redemptorists (C.SS.R.) (1960.06.25 – retired 1987.10.30), died 1999
 José Palmeira Lessa (1987.10.30 – 1996.12.06), also Coadjutor Archbishop of Aracaju (Brazil) (1996.12.06 – 1998.08.26); previously Titular Bishop of Sita (1982.06.21 – 1987.10.30) as Auxiliary Bishop of (São Sebastião do) Rio de Janeiro (Brazil) (1982.06.21 – 1987.10.30); next succeeded as Metropolitan Archbishop of above Aracaju (1998.08.26 – retired 2017.01.18)
 Mário Rino Sivieri (1997.03.18 – 2017.10.25), no previous prelature, died 2020

Other priest of this diocese who became bishop
Antônio dos Santos Cabral, appointed Bishop of Natal in 1917

See also 
 List of Catholic dioceses in Brazil

References

Sources end external links 
 GCatholic.org, with Google map & satellite photo - data for all sections
 Catholic Hierarchy

Roman Catholic dioceses in Brazil
Roman Catholic Ecclesiastical Province of Aracajú
Religious organizations established in 1960
Roman Catholic dioceses and prelatures established in the 20th century
1960 establishments in Brazil